There are 33 counties in the U.S. state of New Mexico.

The New Mexico Territory was organized in September 1850. The first nine counties in the territory to be created, in 1852, were Bernalillo, Doña Ana, Rio Arriba, San Miguel, Santa Ana, Santa Fe, Socorro, Taos, and Valencia Counties. Mora County was created in 1860. Following the Gadsden Purchase of 1853–1854, the northeasternmost part of the New Mexico Territory was ceded to the new Colorado Territory in February 1861, before the western half was reorganized as the Arizona Territory in February 1863, establishing New Mexico's present-day boundaries.

Grant County was created in 1868, followed by Colfax and Lincoln Counties in 1869. In 1876, Santa Ana County was absorbed by Bernalillo County. A further 14 counties were then created between 1884 and 1909, bringing the total number to 26.

New Mexico was admitted to the Union as the 47th state on January 6, 1912. De Baca and Lea Counties were created in 1917, followed by Hidalgo County in 1920 and Catron and Harding Counties in 1921. Los Alamos County was created in 1949 and finally Cibola County in 1981, bringing the total number of counties to 33.

The Federal Information Processing Standard (FIPS) code, which is used by the United States government to uniquely identify states and counties, is provided with each entry. New Mexico's code is 35, which when combined with any county code would be written as 35XXX. The FIPS code for each county links to census data for that county. 


List
For comparison, the population estimate for the state of New Mexico as of July 2011 was 2,082,224, and the area was  mi2 (315,194 km2).

Former counties
 Arizona County, New Mexico Territory, is mentioned in the 1860 United States Census.
 Mesilla County, appears on 1860s-era territorial map encompassing area in present-day Dona Aña, Grant, Hidalgo, Luna, Sierra west of the Rio Grande
 Santa Ana County (1844–1876) absorbed by Bernalillo County; portions are in present-day McKinley County
 Santa Fe County, Texas (1848-1850), never organized, included the portion of New Mexico east of the Rio Grande except for southeastern New Mexico east of the Pecos River and south of the Prairie Dog Town Fork Red River as well as the Trans-Pecos and most of the Panhandle regions of Texas, the Oklahoma Panhandle, and portions of Colorado, Kansas, and Wyoming. Before Texas ceded its western lands to the federal government after the Compromise of 1850, the following counties were briefly created from Santa Fe County earlier that year in south-central New Mexico between the Rio Grande and the Pecos:
 El Paso County, Texas
 Worth County, Texas

References

External links

Maps of historic New Mexico counties

New Mexico, counties in
 
Counties